Karnaukhovka is a rural locality (a selo) in Belgorodsky District, Belgorod Oblast, Russia. The population was 94 as of 2010. There are 3 streets.

Geography 
Karnaukhovka is located in 38 km southeast of Maysky (the district's administrative centre). Maslova Pristan is the nearest rural locality.

References 

Rural localities in Belgorodsky District
Belgorodsky Uyezd